The Lo Nuestro Award for Best Salsa Performance (or Lo Nuestro Award for Salsa Artist of the Year) is an honor presented annually by American network Univision. The Lo Nuestro Awards were first awarded in 1989 and has been given annually since to recognize the most talented performers of Latin music. The nominees and winners were originally selected by a voting poll conducted among program directors of Spanish-language radio stations in the United States and also based on chart performance on Billboard Latin music charts, with the results being tabulated and certified by the accounting firm Deloitte. At the present time, the winners are selected by the audience through an online survey. The trophy awarded is shaped in the form of a treble clef.

The award was first presented to Puerto-Rican American band Son by Four in 2001. American performer Marc Anthony holds the record for the most awards with five, and most nominations with nine. Multiple winners include Nicaraguan singer Luis Enrique and American performer Víctor Manuelle with three awards each. Puerto-Rican American singer Jerry Rivera is the most nominated performer without a win, with five unsuccessful nominations.

Winners and nominees
Listed below are the winners and nominees of the award for each year.

Multiple wins/nominations

See also
 Grammy Award for Best Salsa Album
 Grammy Award for Best Salsa/Merengue Album
 Latin Grammy Award for Best Salsa Album

References

Salsa
Salsa music
Awards established in 2001